Blue Microphones (legally Baltic Latvian Universal Electronics, LLC) is an American audio production company owned by Logitech that designs and produces microphones, headphones, recording tools, signal processors, and music accessories for audio professionals, musicians and consumers.

History
BLUE Microphones was founded in 1995 by American session musician Skipper Wise and Latvian recording engineer Mārtiņš Saulespurēns. The company's name is a backronym for Baltic Latvian Universal Electronics. The company was started up in Latvia, with the development of the first few prototypes happening there, and now it is headquartered in Westlake Village, California, United States.

BLUE Microphones first creation was the “bottle,” a versatile studio XLR microphone encompassing interchangeable capsules curated to isolate sonic signatures for any application which became widely used among professional recording musicians. The concept of this came from Skipper’s daughter Jessica, an aspiring singer at age 12, suggested to Skipper to create a microphone for sending audio recordings through the internet. The sizing and shape of the snowball was similar in size to a softball. With a nudge from Apple Inc., the Westlake Village company created a low-cost condenser microphone called the Snowball for use with music recording software, GarageBand. That microphone became popular with aspiring pro musicians and dedicated hobbyists as an alternative to renting time in a recording studio.

The first BLUE microphone was created in 1995 in Riga, Latvia.

From 1995 - 2004 BLUE microphones were manufactured in Latvia, from 2005 the production moved to China, with some microphones being built in the US.

In 2008, Skipper and Martins sold BLUE Microphones to Transom Capital, a private Equity firm from Southern California.

In 2013, The Riverside Company acquired BLUE Microphones from Transom Capital. Intrepid Investment Bankers advised BLUE Microphones in the transaction.

In July 2018, Logitech announced plans to acquire Blue Microphones for $117 million USD.

Awards
 Electronic Musician 2000 Editor’s Choice Microphone of the Year - Blueberry condenser microphone
 RetailVision 2009 Best Hardware peripheral - Mikey and Eyeball 2.0
 BeatWeek (formerly iProng) Best in Show 2009, 2010
 Blue Yeti X was awarded for Innovation in 2020 by CES (Consumer Technology Association)

See also
C-Media - supplier of chips for USB microphones
List of microphone manufacturers

References

External links

BLUE Designs Website BLUE Website
Interview with Skipper Wise NAMM Oral History Library (2011)
Interview with Martin Saulespurens NAMM Oral History Library

Companies based in Westlake Village, California
Manufacturing companies based in Greater Los Angeles
Microphone manufacturers
Electronics companies established in 1995
American companies established in 1995
2018 mergers and acquisitions
Audio equipment manufacturers of the United States
American subsidiaries of foreign companies
Logitech